In theoretical physics, F-theory is a branch of string theory developed by Iranian physicist Cumrun Vafa.  The new vacua described by F-theory were discovered by Vafa and allowed string theorists to construct new realistic vacua — in the form of F-theory compactified on elliptically fibered Calabi–Yau four-folds. The letter "F" supposedly stands for "Father".

Compactifications

F-theory is formally a 12-dimensional theory, but the only way to obtain an acceptable background is to compactify this theory on a two-torus. By doing so, one obtains type IIB superstring theory in 10 dimensions. The SL(2,Z) S-duality symmetry of the resulting type IIB string theory is manifest because it arises as the group of large diffeomorphisms of the two-dimensional torus.

More generally, one can compactify F-theory on an elliptically fibered manifold (elliptic fibration), i.e. a fiber bundle whose fiber is a two-dimensional torus (also called an elliptic curve). For example, a subclass of the K3 manifolds is elliptically fibered, and F-theory on a K3 manifold is dual to heterotic string theory on a two-torus. Also, the moduli spaces of those theories should be isomorphic.

The large number of semirealistic solutions to string theory referred to as the string theory landscape, with  elements or so, is dominated by F-theory compactifications on Calabi–Yau four-folds.

Phenomenology
New models of Grand Unified Theory have recently been developed using F-theory.

Extra time dimension
F-theory has the metric signature (10,2), which means that it includes a second time dimension.

See also 

 Dilaton
 Axion
 M-theory

References

String theory